Roy Parker may refer to:
 Roy Parker (baseball) (1896–1954), American Major League Baseball pitcher
 Roy H. Parker (1890–1970), U.S. Army chaplain
 Roy R. Parker, biochemist